is an action video game for the Nintendo Entertainment System (NES), which was released in 1988.

In this game, based on a popular manga, the player takes on the role of Golgo 13 (also known as Duke Togo), an assassin whose objective is to destroy the leader of the Drek group. The story begins when a helicopter transporting a vial of a deadly bacillus known as "Cassandra G" is destroyed near the Statue of Liberty, but the vial is nowhere to be found in the wreckage. Golgo 13 is blamed for the destruction and possible theft as a bullet of an M-16 was discovered in the wreckage, which he is known for being partial to. However, those in FIXER refuse to place blame on Golgo 13, and task him with hunting down the real assassin. On the way, Golgo 13 must pass through several areas, including East Berlin, Athens, Rio de Janeiro, and Alexander Island, which is located off the coast of Antarctica.

See also
The Mafat Conspiracy

References

External links

Golgo 13 instruction manual.

1988 video games
Action-adventure games
Cold War video games
Golgo 13
Helicopter video games
Nintendo Entertainment System-only games
Spy video games
Vic Tokai games
Video games set in Antarctica
Video games set in Europe
Video games based on anime and manga
Video games developed in Japan
Nintendo Entertainment System games
Video games set in Athens
Video games set in Berlin
Video games set in Brazil
Video games set in East Germany